William Davis Garrett "Dub" Jr. (January 29, 1925 – July 24, 1976) was an American football guard who played one season with the Chicago Bears of the National Football League. He was drafted by the Chicago Bears in the third round of the 1948 NFL Draft. He was also drafted by the Baltimore Colts in the second round of the 1948 AAFC Draft with the tenth overall pick. Garrett played college football at Mississippi State University and attended Dundee High School in Dundee, Mississippi.

References

External links
Just Sports Stats

1925 births
1976 deaths
Players of American football from Mississippi
American football guards
American football defensive tackles
Mississippi State Bulldogs football players
Baltimore Colts (1947–1950) players
Chicago Bears players
People from Dundee, Mississippi